Lee Jong-ho (born July 31, 1986) is a South Korean footballer who plays as striker. His main position is a striker.

Lee is a graduate of Paris Saint-Germain Academy, and previously played for Hallelujah (now Goyang Zaicro) in the K League Challenge in his native South Korea and in the FAS Premier League in Singapore.

References

1986 births
Living people
Association football forwards
Expatriate footballers in Cambodia
South Korean expatriates in Cambodia
South Korean footballers
South Korea international footballers